Scotts Valley High School (SVHS) is a public high school located in Scotts Valley, California.  It was founded in 1999 and is a part of the Scotts Valley Unified School District, which is in Santa Cruz County.

Athletics
Scotts Valley sports include wrestling, swimming, cross country, baseball, football, basketball, lacrosse, tennis, soccer, volleyball, track and field, cheerleading, and softball.

Notable people

Alumni

Dominique Parrish, World Champion wrestler
Shane Carle, Major League Baseball pitcher
Robbie Erlin, Major League Baseball pitcher

Faculty
Joe Nedney former NFL placekicker, assistant football coach

References

External links
 Scotts Valley High School website
 Scotts Valley Unified School District website

High schools in Santa Cruz County, California
International Baccalaureate schools in California
Public high schools in California
Educational institutions established in 1999
1999 establishments in California